Elizabeth Sewell may refer to:

 Elizabeth Sewell (writer) (1919–2001), British-American critic, poet and novelist
 Elizabeth Sewell (activist) (1940–1988), New Zealand activist
 Elizabeth Anesta Sewell (1872–1959), Welsh-born writer
 Elizabeth Missing Sewell (1815–1906), English author of religious and educational texts